From the Shallows was a deathcore band from Toledo, Ohio. The band formed in 2005, but over the years, has gone a hiatus. The band has had many members, that included a former member of The Black Dahlia Murder. The band has gotten good reviews from sites such as AllMusic and MetalSucks. The band's debut (and so far only) release, Beyond the Unknown was produced by Joey Sturgis (The Devil Wears Prada, Gwen Stacy). The band has played live with Once Nothing, Woe of Tyrants, and The Ghost Inside.

Name and beliefs
Lead Guitarist Marco Mendoza addressed if the band was a Christian band or not, on YouTube. He also stated their original name. Here is the full statement:

Members
Current
 Steffan Howey - lead vocals (2005–2009)
 Marco Mendoza - lead guitar (2005–2009) <small>
 Joe Frost - rhythm guitar (2006–2009)
 Pierce Roberts - bass (2007-2009)
 David Rhoades - drums (2005–2009) (ex-Settle the Sky)

Former
 Gabe Fry - rhythm guitar
 Bobby Futey - rhythm guitar
 Jon Deering - bass (2005-2007) (ex-The Black Dahlia Murder)
 Matt Smith - bass

Discography
EPs
 Beyond the Unknown (May 8, 2007; Tribunal Records)

References

External links
From the Shallows on Myspace

American Christian metal musical groups
American deathcore musical groups
Musical groups established in 2005
Musical groups from Ohio